Michael Farris Smith is an American writer from Mississippi. As of 2021, Smith has published six novels: The Hands of Strangers (2011), Rivers (2013), Desperation Road (2017), The Fighter (2018), Blackwood (2020), and Nick (2021).

Early life and education 
Michael Farris Smith was born in McComb, Mississippi. He was raised in a deeply religious family; Smith's father was a Southern Baptist minister. His family moved around many times, and lived in Magnolia, Mississippi. Smith attended South Pike High School and graduated from Parklane Academy in 1988. He played baseball at Southwest Mississippi Community College. He earned a B.A. from Mississippi State University, an M.Ed. from William Carey College and a Ph.D. from the University of Southern Mississippi. After graduating from Mississippi State, Smith spent several years living abroad in Switzerland and France. He began writing fiction while studying at the University of Southern Mississippi's Center for Writers. Smith taught at Auburn University and at Mississippi University for Women, where he was an associate professor of English.

Career

The Hands of Strangers (2011) 
In early 2011, Smith's debut work, The Hands of Strangers, was published by the Mint Hill Books imprint of the Charlotte-based publisher Main Street Rag Publishing. It is a novella set in Paris and focuses on Jon and Estelle, whose nine-year-old daughter Jennifer is kidnapped during a class field trip at the Musée d'Orsay. In its starred review, Publishers Weekly wrote, "Smith captures the essence of the helpless, making more of an impact than most novels three times its size."

Rivers (2013) 
In September 2013, Smith's first full-length novel, Rivers, was published by Simon & Schuster. Rivers is set in post-Hurricane Katrina Mississippi in the distant future as a series of violent storms devastate the state's southern Gulf Coast. It has been described both as post-apocalyptic fiction and dystopian fiction. In its starred review, Kirkus Reviews praised Smith's "expertly executed" example of a post-apocalyptic society and the novel's "compelling" plot; the publication also called Smith's prose "lush, descriptive and even beautiful." In her review for The Washington Post, novelist Mary Doria Russell praised Smith's realistic character development and his "honed prose" for building tension. Russell, however, criticized the novel for being too short and called its ending a "surprising disappointment." The New York Times praised Smith's "incantatory prose" for powering the narrative.

Rivers was awarded the 2014 Mississippi Authors Award for Fiction by the Mississippi Library Association.

Desperation Road (2017) 
Smith's third novel, Desperation Road, was published in February 2017 by Lee Boudreaux Books, an imprint of Little, Brown and Company. Set in the Mississippi, it follows Russell Gaines, who is released from Mississippi State Penitentiary after serving an eleven-year sentence. As he travels back to his hometown of McComb, his path intertwines with that of Maben Jones. Jones, a homeless woman and former addict, is searching for a life for her and her young daughter Annalee. When a deputy sheriff attempts to rape Maben, she shoots and kills him. In its starred review, Kirkus Reviews wrote, "Smith writes shapely prose and sharp dialogue and everywhere displays an acute sense of the moments and pain that can define lives in a small town."

Desperation Road was a finalist for the 2018 Southern Book Prize. It was also longlisted for the 2017 Gold Dagger in the United Kingdom. The novel's French translation was a finalist for the 2017 Grand prix des lectrices de Elle.

The Fighter (2018) 
Smith's fourth novel, The Fighter, was published in March 2018 by Little, Brown and Company.

The Fighter is currently being adapted into a film, entitled Rumble Through the Dark, directed by brothers Parker and Graham Phillips and produced by Cassian Elwes. Smith wrote the screenplay adaptation of the novel.

Blackwood (2020) 
Smith's fifth novel, Blackwood, was published in March 2020 by Little, Brown and Company.

Blackwood was included on NPR's "Best Books of 2020" list, The Timess "Best fiction books of the year 2020" list, and The Atlanta Journal-Constitution "10 best Southern books of 2020" list.

Nick (2021) 

Smith's sixth novel, Nick, was published on January 5, 2021 by Little, Brown and Company. It is a prequel to The Great Gatsby, F. Scott Fitzgerald's landmark 1925 novel. The Great Gatsbys U.S. copyright expired on January 1, 2021, when all works published in 1925 entered the public domain in the United States. Nick centers on the narrator of The Great Gatsby, Nick Carraway, in the years before the events of Fitzgerald's novel. It follows Nick Carraway as a soldier in World War I, his detours in Paris, and his time in New Orleans before his move up to Long Island. Kirkus Reviews called Nick a "compelling character study." In his review for The New York Times, Ben Fountain called it an "exemplary novel" with a "classic American sound" and praised Smith's unique rendering of Nick Carraway. Publishers Weekly praised the "striking imagery" of the war chapters, but felt the novel ultimately did not provide any deeper understand of Nick Carraway. The Los Angeles Times agreed, criticizing the novel as devolving into a melodrama and reprocessing Nick Carraway rather than clarifying his character. Ron Charles of The Washington Post felt the novel failed to expand on the original story, and criticized its second half for withdrawing Nick's perspective too far and leaving readers with "noir caricatures and their lurid spat."

Short fiction 
Smith's short fiction has twice been nominated for a Pushcart Prize.

Personal life 
As of 2021, Smith lives with his wife and two daughters in Oxford, Mississippi.

In June 2020, Smith wrote an op-ed in the Jackson Free Press advocating for the removal of the Confederate battle flag from the Flag of Mississippi.

Bibliography

Novels

Short fiction

Essays

References 

Year of birth missing (living people)
Living people
21st-century American novelists
American male novelists
People from Magnolia, Mississippi
People from McComb, Mississippi
Southwest Mississippi Community College alumni
Mississippi State University alumni
William Carey University alumni
University of Southern Mississippi alumni
Mississippi University for Women faculty
21st-century American male writers